The 2013 Philippine Collegiate Championship was the sixth edition of the Philippine Collegiate Champions League (PCCL), the postseason tournament to determine the national collegiate champions in basketball organized by the Samahang Basketbol ng Pilipinas (SBP), the national basketball federation. The tournament was the sixth edition of the tournament in its current incarnation, and the eleventh edition overall.

The De La Salle Green Archers defeated the SWU Cobras in the best-of-three championship series, 2–0. There was no third-place game in this year's edition of the tournament, and so the FEU Tamaraws and the San Beda Red Lions shared the third-place honors.

Qualifying
*Replaced by UP.**Replaced by Lyceum.

Zonals
5th-6th NCAA and UAAP teams seeded to the Metro Manila regionals
League champions from other than CESAFI, NCAA and UAAP are seeded to nearest zonal tournaments.

Regionals
2nd-4th UAAP and NCAA teams seeded to the Metro Manila–Luzon regionals
Top 3 CESAFI teams seeded to the Southern regionals

Final four
NCAA and UAAP champions qualify to the Final Four automatically.

Zonals
The delay in the completion of NCAA Season 89 has led to the rescheduling of the qualifying tournaments. The tournaments were supposed to start on October 25.

Metro Manila
The Metro Manila zonals were held at the Technological Institute of the Philippines (TIP) gym from November 20 to 22.

Group A

Group B

Luzon

South Luzon/Bicol
Quezon champion: Calayan Cougars
Legaspi champion: STI Sta. Rosa Olympians
Tabaco champion: Amando Cope Green Serpents
Naga champion: Naga College Foundation Tigers
Sorsogon champion: Lewis Blazing Fox
Batangas champion: U of Batangas Brahmans

North/Central Luzon
The North/Central Luzon zonal was held at the University of Northern Philippines (UNP) gym from November 11 to 15.
Vigan champion: UNP Sharks
La Union champion: La Finns Scholastica Lionhearts
Pampanga champion: Lyceum of Subic Bay Sharks
Pangasinan champion: Lyceum Northwestern Dukes
Baguio champion: U of Baguio Cardinals

Third-place playoff

Final

Visayas
The Visayas zonals were supposed to be held at the Ormoc Superdome but due to the destruction of Typhoon Haiyan (Yolanda), the games were moved to the Cebu Coliseum. Also, due to the typhoon and to the Bohol earthquake a month earlier, the champions from Bohol (Bohol Institute of Technology-International College Crusaders) and Ormoc (Western Leyte College Mustangs) skipped the tournament.

Mindanao

Northern Mindanao
STI-Cagayan de Oro Olympians defeated St. Columbian College, St. Paul University of Surigao, Christ the King College de Maranding, Bukidnon State University, and Mindanao State University-Marawi and Medical Center in the Northern Mindanao zonals.

Southern Mindanao
The Southern Mindanao zonals was held at the Almendras Gym in Davao City from November 10 to 13.

Team standings

Third-place playoff

Final

Regionals

Luzon–Metro Manila
The first two rounds were held at the First Asia Institute of Technology and Humanities (FAITH) Gym in Tanauan, Batangas from November 25 to 26; the final three rounds are held at the Ynares Sports Arena in Pasig from November 28 to December 3.

First 3 rounds

Final 3 rounds

Southern Islands
The Southern Islands regional was held at Cebu City's Cebu Coliseum from November 18 to 20.

Final four

High school exhibition games

Finals

References

External links
Official website

2013
2013–14 in Philippine basketball leagues